Toy Story 2 is a 1999 side-scrolling platform game for Game Boy Color based on the film of the same name. The game was developed by Tiertex Design Studios and published by THQ. It was released in November 1999 in North America with the European version releasing the following year. The premise of the game loosely follows the original film with players taking control of Buzz Lightyear on a mission to rescue Woody by traversing through stages.

Gameplay
The Game Boy Color version is a side-scrolling platform game unrelated to the other versions. The player controls Buzz, who can jump, run, and shoot his laser at enemies. It features 11 levels, including two bonus levels that can be accessed if the player collects all the coins located in certain levels. Because the Game Boy Color has only two action buttons, Buzz's running and jumping are both done through the B button. While standing motionless, the player can jump and move across gaps, whereas running is initiated by pressing the B button while moving. Gameplay is saved through a password feature.

Development
Toy Story 2 was developed by Tiertex Design Studios, which also developed the Game Boy version of the original Toy Story game. The Game Boy Color version was published by THQ and was also released in the U.S. in November the same year.

Reception

The Game Boy Color version was considered average, with Game Informer criticizing its lack of originality. It was also criticized for its control setup with regards to running and jumping; IGN's Craig Harris wrote that "granted, you can't do much with only two action buttons, but it's obvious Tiertex wanted three". Doug Trueman of GameSpot praised Buzz's animation but stated that many of the other toys in the game did not look as good. Trueman considered the sound and music to be average, and stated that background graphics often blended in too well with the foreground. Weiss called the Game Boy Color version an "adequate, but very forgettable and very short game", while saying it can become quickly tedious. Weiss believed the addition of boss enemies and more action would have helped, although he considered the animation and artwork to be above average for a Game Boy Color game. Official Nintendo Magazine also found the game lacking in action and its visuals "drab". Superjuegos writer J.C. Mayerick highlighted the "catchy music" and the ninth stage, but overall criticized it as the first Toy Story Game Boy game released years prior, only with the addition of color; he concluded that young players who are attached to the Toy Storys characters would not be interested in a Game Boy game, thus the game had little value in the marketplace. He condemned its mediocre graphics and poor animation. THQ president and CEO Brian Farrell said the game was a hit for THQ during Q4 of 1999.

References

External links

Game Boy Color games
Game Boy Color-only games
THQ games
Toy Story video games
Single-player video games
Platform games
1999 video games
Tiertex Design Studios games
Video games developed in the United Kingdom